William Lee Rayborn (May 15, 1936 - April 5, 2019) was an American dental technician and Democratic politician. He was a member of the Mississippi State Senate from 1980 to 2000.

Biography 
William Lee Rayborn was born on May 15, 1936, in McComb, Mississippi. He was the son of Harvey Lee Rayborn and Minnie Jones Rayborn.  He represented Mississippi's 40th district as a Democrat in the Mississippi State Senate from 1980 to 2000. He died on April 5, 2019, in Brookhaven, Mississippi.

Personal life 
He was married to Doris Nettles, who predeceased him. He had at least four children; four of whom survived him.

References 

1936 births
2019 deaths
Democratic Party Mississippi state senators
People from Brookhaven, Mississippi